Pere de Montsó (fl. 1173), also Peire de Monzo(n), was an Aragonese troubadour, though none of his compositions survive. He was probably from Monzón near the border with Catalonia, but he may have hailed from Monzón de Campos in Castile, as Ramón Menéndez Pidal believed. He is the subject of the eighth stanza of a famous satire of twelve troubadours by Peire d'Alvernhe. This stanza has different readings:

The verse is very unclear. The first reading suggests that Raymond V of Toulouse had heard Pere sing. If Pattison's reconstruction of events surrounding Peire d'Alvernhe's satire is correct, however, Pere de Montsó was attached to the Spanish entourage (possibly as a jongleur) of Eleanor, daughter of Henry II of England and fiancée of Alfonso VIII of Castile, who was travelling through Gascony on her way to Spain when she and her entourage were entertained by Peire's satire. Pattison suggest on the basis of this stanza that the troupe had also travelled through the lands of Toulouse and met in the presence of the Count, whose whereabouts at the time are otherwise unrecorded.

On the second reading, it is clear that Raymond V is alleged to have composed a tune that was subsequently used by Pere, but whether it was stolen from Pere by a third party or whether Pere was considered a thief for using another's melody is not clear.

References

Pattison, Walter T. (1933). "The Background of Peire D'Alvernhe's Chantarai D'Aquest Trobadors." Modern Philology, 31:1 (Aug.), pp. 19–34.
Riquer, Martín de (1964). Història de la Literatura Catalana, vol. 1. Barcelona: Edicions Ariel.

Notes

12th-century Spanish troubadours
Year of death unknown
Year of birth unknown
12th-century people from the Kingdom of Aragon